Rowland Park may refer to:

 Rowland Park (New Jersey)
 Rowland Park (New South Wales)

See also
 Roland Park, Baltimore, Maryland, US